The National Workers Union is a trade union in Trinidad and Tobago. The Union was formed on 15 October 2004 and is Registered with the Registrar of Trade Unions (Reg No. 501).

The NWU is a general union which specialises in representing workers from non-unionised workplaces and represents workers in bilateral meetings with employers through the Ministry of Labour to the Industrial Court.

The Union has two bargaining units: Twin Island Shipping and National Petroleum.

See also

 List of trade unions

References

External links
 National Workers Union

Trade unions in Trinidad and Tobago